Mari, or Hop, is a minor Austronesian language of Madang Province, Papua New Guinea. It is spoken in the four villages of Bumbu, Bubirumpun, Musuam, and Sangkiang in Usino Rural LLG of the Ramu valley.

References

Markham languages
Languages of Madang Province